Water spaniel (capitalized in the names of standardized breeds) was originally a term for water dogs generally, and today refer to several different breeds of water dogs that actually are spaniels, such as:
 American Water Spaniel
 English Water Spaniel, extinct
 Irish Water Spaniel
 Tweed Water Spaniel, extinct